David Thomas Bush (born November 9, 1979) is an American professional baseball coach and former pitcher. He is currently the pitching coach for the Boston Red Sox of Major League Baseball (MLB). The right-hander played in MLB (–) for the Toronto Blue Jays, Milwaukee Brewers and Texas Rangers. Bush also played for the SK Wyverns of the KBO League in 2012.

Early life
Bush graduated from Conestoga High School in Berwyn, Pennsylvania and played college baseball at Wake Forest University where he was a double major in psychology and sociology. In 2000 and 2001, he played collegiate summer baseball for the Chatham A's of the Cape Cod Baseball League (CCBL), where he posted a league-leading 11 saves in 2000 with an earned run average of 0.84, and returned in 2001 to post an ERA of 0.34. In 2011, Bush was inducted into the CCBL Hall of Fame.

Playing career

Milwaukee Brewers
On August 11, 2010, in a game against the Arizona Diamondbacks, Bush became the third player in Major League history to allow four straight home runs (Paul Foytack and Chase Wright were the others). Bush was touched for consecutive solo blasts by Adam LaRoche, Miguel Montero, Mark Reynolds and Stephen Drew.

Texas Rangers
On January 30, 2011, Bush signed a minor league contract with the Texas Rangers as their long reliever. He was designated for assignment on July 1, 2011. He was released on July 6.

Chicago Cubs
Bush signed a minor league contract with the Chicago Cubs on July 15. He opted out of his contract on August 11, after appearing in five games for the Triple-A Iowa Cubs, recording a 6.14 ERA.

Philadelphia Phillies
On August 14, 2011, Bush signed a minor league contract with the Philadelphia Phillies. On June 5, 2012, Bush opted out of that contract to pitch for the SK Wyverns of the KBO.

Toronto Blue Jays
Bush started the 2013 season with the Triple-A Buffalo Bisons, but the Blue Jays brought him up on April 6 when Jeremy Jeffress was designated for assignment. Bush was designated for assignment on April 8, 2013. Bush cleared waivers and was assigned to Triple-A Buffalo.

Near no-hitters
On three instances in Bush's career, he flirted with a no-hitter, taking it beyond seven complete innings. The first was on July 20, 2004, while pitching with the Blue Jays in only his third major-league starting appearance. He pitched  innings against the Oakland A's until Damian Miller, his future teammate with the Brewers, singled against him. In Milwaukee, Bush's next opportunity came against his former team, Toronto, on June 19, 2008. Lyle Overbay, the man Bush was traded for, led off the eighth inning with a triple to end the bid. In an April 23, 2009 game against the Philadelphia Phillies, he once again took the no-hit bid  innings before giving up a home run to Matt Stairs.

Post-playing career

Bush began working in private business in Bridgton, Maine, in 2011, but he remained in baseball as a coach at Bridgton Academy. He joined MLB International as an envoy-coach in March 2015, serving for two years as a pitching coach with national teams from China and South Africa, then joined the Red Sox late in 2016 as a pitching development analyst.. On January 10, 2019, Bush was named minor league pitching coordinator (performance) for the Boston Red Sox of Major League Baseball.

On October 31, 2019, Bush was named the pitching coach for the Boston Red Sox.

References

External links

 Dave Bush at Baseball Almanac
 Career statistics and player information from the KBO League

1979 births
American expatriate baseball players in Canada
American expatriate baseball players in South Korea
Auburn Doubledays players
baseball coaches from Pennsylvania
baseball players from Pennsylvania
Boston Red Sox coaches
Buffalo Bisons (minor league) players
Chatham Anglers players
Dunedin Blue Jays players
Huntsville Stars players
Iowa Cubs players
KBO League pitchers
Lehigh Valley IronPigs players
living people
Major League Baseball pitchers
Major League Baseball pitching coaches
Milwaukee Brewers players
minor league baseball coaches
Nashville Sounds players
New Haven Ravens players
people from Bridgton, Maine
SSG Landers players
sportspeople from Pennsylvania
Syracuse SkyChiefs players
Texas Rangers players
Toronto Blue Jays players
Wake Forest Demon Deacons baseball players
Wisconsin Timber Rattlers players
Anchorage Bucs players
Alaska Goldpanners of Fairbanks players